Namkabuan Nongkeepahuyuth (2 February 1973 – 7 April 2021) was a Muay Thai fighter from Thailand.

Biography and career
He was born as Kampiaw Sijantuek (คำเพียว สีจันทึก; nickname: Piaw; เพียว). He is the younger brother of legendary fighter Namphon Nongkeepahuyuth. He fought for the first time in 1987 for a purse of 3,000 baht.

During his brother's heyday, Namkabuan was considered an ordinary fighter with ordinary skills. He was famously knocked out in 33 seconds by Wangchannoi Sor.Palangchai via a left hook.

By the time his brother retired in the early 1990s, he had developed his skills to become a top fighter of the era. He faced many famous fighters, such as Sakmongkol Sithchuchok, Nuathoranee Tongraja, Oley Kiatoneway, Jongrak Lukprabaht, Jongsanan Fairtex, Lamnamoon Sor.Sumalee, Pairoj Wor.Walapon, Matee Jedeepitak, Robert Kaennorasing, Boonlai Sor.Thanikul, Therdkiat Sittepitak, Chatchai Paiseetong, Orono Por.MuangUbon, Silapathai Jockygym, and Ramon Dekkers. His highest purse was 260,000 baht.

A favourite technique of his was to grab the leg of an opponent and charge forward to put him off balance, which is called in Thai "thi na" (ไถนา; lit: 'plowing'). The rules of Muay Thai have changed to prohibit the use of the technique due to it being considered too dangerous after Rainbow Sor.Pralantay broke his neck plowing Den Muangsurin.

Namkabuan won the Junior lightweight Lumpinee Stadium title, and held the title for six years without any fighter defeating him in a title challenge until his retirement.

In retirement, he opened a mu kratha restaurant in Khorat like his brother.

In September 2016, Namkabuan's older brother Namphon Nongkeepahuyuth, only 47 years old, died of pneumonitis

Four years later, Namkabuan died of lung cancer on 7 April 2021. He had been diagnosed with stage 4 lung cancer in January 2021.

Titles
Lumpinee Stadium
 1991 Lumpinee Stadium Junior lightweight (130 lbs) Champion (Defended five times)
World Muay Thai Council 
 1995 WMC Junior lightweight Champion (130 lbs)

Sports Writers Association of Thailand
 1992 Fight of the Year (vs Robert Kaennorasing)

Fight record

|- style="background:#cfc;"
| 2009-03-07 || Win ||align=left| Payaknoi Wor.Wiwattananon || Bangkok Boxing Stadium || Bangkok, Thailand  || Decision || 5 || 3:00
|-  style="background:#fbb;"
| 2002 || Loss ||align=left| Attachai Fairtex || Lumpinee Stadium|| Bangkok, Thailand|| Decision || 5 || 3:00
|- style="background:#fbb;"
| 2000-10-22 || Loss ||align=left| Taweesak Singkklongsi || Lumpinee Stadium || Bangkok, Thailand  || Decision || 5 || 3:00
|- style="background:#;"
| 2000-05-27 || ||align=left| Seuathai Kiatchansing || Lumpinee Stadium || Bangkok, Thailand  || Decision || 5 || 3:00
|- style="background:#fbb;"
| 1998-12-08 || Loss ||align=left| Kaolan Kaovichit || Lumpinee Stadium || Bangkok, Thailand  || Decision || 5 || 3:00
|- style="background:#fbb;"
| 1998–09-29 || Loss||align=left| Attachai Por.Yosanan ||  Lumpinee Stadium || Bangkok, Thailand || Decision || 5 || 3:00
|-
! style=background:white colspan=9 |
|- style="background:#fbb;"
| 1998-08-07 || Loss||align=left| Attachai Por.Yosanan ||  Lumpinee Stadium || Bangkok, Thailand || Decision || 5 || 3:00

|- style="background:#cfc;"
| 1997-09- || Win ||align=left| Manu Ntoh  Eddy Saban || Suk OneSongchai, 2 v 1 || Thailand  || Decision || 5 || 3:00
|-
! style=background:white colspan=9 |
|- style="background:#cfc;"
| 1997-07-13 || Win ||align=left| Ramon Dekkers || La Nuit des Titans || Morocco  || Decision || 5 || 3:00
|- style="background:#cfc;"
| 1997-04- || Win ||align=left| Lamnamoon Sor.Sumalee || Lumpinee Stadium || Bangkok, Thailand  || Decision || 5 || 3:00
|- style="background:#fbb;"
| 1997-02-08 || Loss ||align=left| Sakmongkol Sitchuchok|| || Phichit, Thailand  || TKO (Punches) || 1 ||
|- style="background:#fbb;"
| 1997-01-05 || Loss ||align=left| Pairot Wor.Wolapon || Chachoengsao Stadium || Chachoengsao, Thailand  || Decision || 5 || 3:00
|- style="background:#cfc;"
| 1996-11-12 || Win ||align=left| Samkor Chor.Ratchatsupak || Lumpinee Stadium || Bangkok, Thailand  || Decision || 5 || 3:00
|-
! style=background:white colspan=9 |
|- style="background:#cfc;"
| 1996-10-19 || Win ||align=left| Samkor Chor.Ratchatsupak || Lumpinee Stadium || Bangkok, Thailand  || Decision || 5 || 3:00
|- style="background:#fbb;"
| 1996-08-25 || Loss ||align=left| Pairot Wor.Wolapon || Beer Chang Tournament, Lumpinee Stadium || Bangkok, Thailand  || Decision || 5 || 3:00
|- style="background:#fbb;"
| 1996-06-22 || Loss ||align=left| Jongsanan Fairtex || Beer Chang Tournament, Lumpinee Stadium || Bangkok, Thailand  || Decision || 5 || 3:00

|- style="background:#cfc;"
| 1996-05-18 || Win ||align=left| Sakmongkol Sitchuchok|| Beer Chang Tournament, Lumpinee Stadium || Bangkok, Thailand  || Decision || 5 || 3:00
|- style="background:#c5d2ea;"
| 1996-03-29 || Draw ||align=left| Mathee Jedeepitak || Lumpinee Stadium || Bangkok, Thailand  || Decision || 5 || 3:00

|- style="background:#cfc;"
| 1996-03-05 || Win ||align=left| Prabpramlek Sitnarong || Lumpinee Stadium || Bangkok, Thailand  || Decision || 5 || 3:00
|-
! style=background:white colspan=9 |

|- style="background:#cfc;"
| 1995-12-08 || Win ||align=left| Lamnamoon Sor.Sumalee || Lumpinee Stadium || Bangkok, Thailand  || Decision || 5 || 3:00
|- style="background:#cfc;"
| 1995-10-31 || Win||align=left| Lamnamoon Sor.Sumalee || Lumpinee Stadium || Bangkok, Thailand  || Decision || 5 || 3:00
|- style="background:#cfc;"
| 1995-09-12 || Win ||align=left| Chatchai Paiseetong || Lumpinee Stadium || Bangkok, Thailand  || Decision || 5 || 3:00
|- style="background:#cfc;"
| 1995-08-22 || Win  ||align=left| Samkor Chor.Rathchatasupak || Lumpinee Stadium || Bangkok, Thailand || Decision || 5 || 3:00

|- style="background:#cfc;"
| 1995-07-10 || Win ||align=left| Mathee Jadeepitak || Rajadamnern Stadium || Bangkok, Thailand  || Decision || 5 || 3:00

|- style="background:#fbb;"
| 1995-04-28 || Loss ||align=left| Kongnapa B.M.Service || Lumpinee Stadium || Bangkok, Thailand  || Decision || 5 || 3:00
|- style="background:#fbb;"
| 1995-02-28 || Loss ||align=left| Orono Por Muang Ubon || Lumpinee Stadium || Bangkok, Thailand  || Decision || 5 || 3:00
|- style="background:#fbb;"
| 1995-01-31 || Loss ||align=left| Pairot Wor.Wolapon || Lumpinee Stadium || Bangkok, Thailand  || Decision || 5 || 3:00
|- style="background:#fbb;"
| 1994-10-04|| Loss ||align=left| Sakmongkol Sitchuchok || Lumpinee Stadium || Bangkok, Thailand || Decision  || 5 || 3:00
|- style="background:#fbb;"
| 1994-09-09 || Loss || align="left" | Sakmongkol Sitchuchok|| Lumpinee Stadium|| Bangkok, Thailand|| Decision (split) || 5 || 3:00
|-
! style=background:white colspan=9 |
|- style="background:#cfc;"
| 1994-08-09 || Win ||align=left| Chatchai Paiseetong || Lumpinee Stadium || Bangkok, Thailand  || Decision || 5 || 3:00

|- style="background:#cfc;"
| 1994-06-08 || Win ||align=left| Jongrak Kaiadisorn || Rajadamnern Stadium || Bangkok, Thailand  || Decision || 5 || 3:00

|- style="background:#cfc;"
| 1994-05-03 || Win||align=left| Robert Kaennorasing || Lumpinee Stadium || Bangkok, Thailand  || Decision || 5 || 3:00

|- style="background:#cfc;"
| 1994-03-22 || Win ||align=left| Mathee Jadeepitak || Lumpinee Stadium || Bangkok, Thailand  || KO (elbows & knee) || 2 ||
|- style="background:#cfc;"
| 1994-03-05 || Win ||align=left| Prabpramlek Sitsantat || Lumpinee Stadium || Bangkok, Thailand  || Decision || 5 || 3:00

|- style="background:#cfc;"
| 1994-02-21 || Win ||align=left| Mathee Jadeepitak|| Rajadamnern Stadium || Bangkok, Thailand  || Decision || 5 || 3:00

|- style="background:#cfc;"
| 1994-01-26 || Win ||align=left| Jongrak Lukprabat|| Rajadamnern Stadium || Bangkok, Thailand  || Decision || 5 || 3:00

|- style="background:#cfc;"
| 1993-11-30 || Win ||align=left| Oley Kiatoneway || Lumpinee Stadium || Bangkok, Thailand  || Decision || 5 || 3:00
|- style="background:#cfc;"
| 1993-10-05 || Win ||align=left| Pairot Wor.Wolapon || Lumpinee Stadium || Bangkok, Thailand  || Decision || 5 || 3:00
|-
! style=background:white colspan=9 |

|- style="background:#cfc;"
| 1993-09-07 || Win ||align=left| Jongsanan Luklongbangkaew || Lumpinee Stadium || Bangkok, Thailand  || Decision || 5 || 3:00

|- style="background:#cfc;"
| 1993-08-06 || Win ||align=left| Boonlai Sor.Thanikul || Lumpinee Stadium || Bangkok, Thailand  || Decision || 5 || 3:00

|- style="background:#fbb;"
| 1993-06-11 || Loss ||align=left| Oley Kiatoneway || Lumpinee Stadium || Bangkok, Thailand  || Decision || 5 || 3:00

|- style="background:#cfc;"
| 1993-03-29 || Win ||align=left| Sakmongkol Sitchuchok|| Lumpinee Stadium || Bangkok, Thailand  || Decision || 5 || 3:00
|- style="background:#fbb;"
| 1992-12-23 || Loss ||align=left| Robert Kaennorasing || Rajadamnern Stadium || Bangkok, Thailand  || Decision || 5 || 3:00
|- style="background:#cfc;"
| 1992-11-20 || Win ||align=left| Boonlai Sor.Thanikul || Lumpinee Stadium || Bangkok, Thailand  || Decision || 5 || 3:00
|- style="background:#cfc;"
| 1992-08-14 || Win ||align=left| Nuathoranee Thongracha || Suk OneSongchai, Burswood Casino || Perth, Australia  || Decision || 5 || 3:00
|-
! style=background:white colspan=9 |
|- style="background:#c5d2ea;"
| 1992-06-30 || Draw ||align=left| Nuathoranee Thongracha || Lumpinee Stadium || Bangkok, Thailand  || Decision || 5 || 3:00
|- style="background:#cfc;"
| 1992-06-09 || Win ||align=left| Therdkiat Sitthepitak || Lumpinee Stadium || Bangkok, Thailand  || Decision || 5 || 3:00
|-
! style=background:white colspan=9 |
|- style="background:#fbb;"
| 1992-03-10 || Loss ||align=left| Boonlai Sor.Thanikul || Lumpinee Stadium || Bangkok, Thailand  || Decision || 5 || 3:00
|- style="background:#cfc;"
| 1992-02-21 || Win ||align=left| Sakmongkol Sitchuchok || Lumpinee Stadium || Bangkok, Thailand  || Decision || 5 || 3:00
|- style="background:#cfc;"
| 1992-01-21 || Win ||align=left| Jongsanan Luklongbangkaew || Lumpinee Stadium || Bangkok, Thailand  || Decision || 5 || 3:00
|- style="background:#cfc;"
| 1991-12-27 || Win ||align=left| Wangchannoi Sor.Palangchai || Lumpinee Stadium || Bangkok, Thailand  || Decision || 5 || 3:00
|- style="background:#fbb;"
| 1991-11-26 || Loss ||align=left| Wangchannoi Sor.Palangchai || Lumpinee Stadium || Bangkok, Thailand  || Decision || 5 || 3:00
|- style="background:#cfc;"
| 1991-10-25 || Win ||align=left| Sangtiennoi Sitsurapong || Lumpinee Stadium || Bangkok, Thailand  || Decision || 5 || 3:00
|-
! style=background:white colspan=9 |
|- style="background:#cfc;"
| 1991-09-24 || Win ||align=left| Sangtiennoi Sitsurapong || Lumpinee Stadium || Bangkok, Thailand  || Decision || 5 || 3:00
|- style="background:#cfc;"
| 1991-09-03 || Win ||align=left| Nuathoranee Thongracha || Lumpinee Stadium || Bangkok, Thailand  || Decision || 5 || 3:00
|- style="background:#cfc;"
| 1991-08-06 || Win ||align=left| Nuathoranee Thongracha || Lumpinee Stadium || Bangkok, Thailand  || Decision || 5 || 3:00
|- style="background:#cfc;"
| 1991-07-02 || Win ||align=left| Phetdam Sor.Bodin || Lumpinee Stadium || Bangkok, Thailand  || Decision || 5 || 3:00
|-
! style=background:white colspan=9 |
|- style="background:#cfc;"
| 1991-05-31 || Win ||align=left| Cherry Sor Wanich || Lumpinee Stadium || Bangkok, Thailand  || Decision || 5 || 3:00
|-
! style=background:white colspan=9 |
|- style="background:#cfc;"
| 1991-04-30 || Win ||align=left| Wangchannoi Sor.Palangchai|| Lumpinee Stadium || Bangkok, Thailand  || Decision || 5 || 3:00
|- style="background:#cfc;"
| 1991-03-29 || Win ||align=left| Jaroenthong Kiatbanchong || Lumpinee Stadium || Bangkok, Thailand  || Decision || 5 || 3:00
|- style="background:#cfc;"
| 1991-03-01 || Win ||align=left| Samranthong Kiatbanchong || Lumpinee Stadium || Bangkok, Thailand  || Decision || 5 || 3:00
|- style="background:#cfc;"
| 1991-02-15 || Win ||align=left| Jaroenthong Kiatbanchong || Lumpinee Stadium || Bangkok, Thailand  || Decision|| 5 ||3:00
|- style="background:#cfc;"
| 1991-01-04 || Win ||align=left| Dokmaipa Por Pongsawang|| Lumpinee Stadium || Bangkok, Thailand  || Decision || 5 || 3:00
|- style="background:#cfc;"
| 1990-12-11 || Win ||align=left| Oley Kiatoneway || Lumpinee Stadium || Bangkok, Thailand  || Decision || 5 || 3:00
|- style="background:#fbb;"
| 1990-10-30 || Loss ||align=left| Wangchannoi Sor.Palangchai || Lumpinee Stadium || Bangkok, Thailand  || KO (Left Hook)|| 1 || 0:33
|- style="background:#fbb;"
| 1990-09-25 || Loss ||align=left| Samranthong Kiatbanchong || Lumpinee Stadium || Bangkok, Thailand  || Decision || 5 || 3:00
|- style="background:#cfc;"
| 1990-08-31 || Win ||align=left| Oley Kiatoneway || Lumpinee Stadium || Bangkok, Thailand  || Decision || 5 || 3:00
|- style="background:#cfc;"
| 1990-07-10 || Win ||align=left| Detduang Por.Pongsawang || Lumpinee Stadium || Bangkok, Thailand  || Decision || 5 || 3:00
|- style="background:#fbb;"
| 1990-06-15 || Loss ||align=left| Pimaranlek Sitaran|| Lumpinee Stadium || Bangkok, Thailand  || Decision || 5 || 3:00
|- style="background:#cfc;"
| 1990-05-15 || Win ||align=left| Karuhat Sor.Supawan || Lumpinee Stadium || Bangkok, Thailand  || Decision || 5 || 3:00
|- style="background:#fbb;"
| 1990-04 || Loss ||align=left| Samranthong Kiatbanchong || Lumpinee Stadium || Bangkok, Thailand  || KO || 3 ||
|- style="background:#cfc;"
| 1990-03-23 || Win ||align=left| Noppadet Narumon || Lumpinee Stadium || Bangkok, Thailand  || Decision || 5 || 3:00
|- style="background:#fbb;"
| 1990-02-06 || Loss ||align=left| Oley Kiatoneway || Lumpinee Stadium || Bangkok, Thailand  || Decision || 5 || 3:00
|- style="background:#cfc;"
| 1990-01-19 || Win ||align=left| Karuhat Sor.Supawan || Lumpinee Stadium || Bangkok, Thailand  || KO (leg kick) || 3 ||
|- style="background:#cfc;"
| 1989-12-27 || Win ||align=left| Toto Por Pongsawang || Rajadamnern Stadium || Bangkok, Thailand  || Decision || 5 || 3:00
|- style="background:#cfc;"
| 1989-11-28 || Win ||align=left| Pairojnoi Sor Siamchai || Lumpinee Stadium || Bangkok, Thailand  || Decision || 5 || 3:00
|- style="background:#cfc;"
| 1989-11-03 || Win ||align=left| Paruhatlek Sitchunthong || Lumpinee Stadium || Bangkok, Thailand  || Decision || 5 || 3:00
|- style="background:#cfc;"
| 1989-10-23 || Win ||align=left| Hippy Singmanee ||  || Koh Samui, Thailand  || Decision || 5 || 3:00
|- style="background:#cfc;"
| 1989-10-03 || Win ||align=left| Puja Sittuantong || Lumpinee Stadium || Bangkok, Thailand  || Decision || 5 || 3:00
|- style="background:#cfc;"
| 1989-09-19 || Win ||align=left| Kraiwannoi Sit Kru Od || Lumpinee Stadium || Bangkok, Thailand  || Decision || 5 || 3:00
|- style="background:#fbb;"
| 1989-07-11 || Loss ||align=left| Hippy Singmanee || Lumpinee Stadium || Bangkok, Thailand  || TKO (Doctor Stoppage) || 3 ||
|-
! style=background:white colspan=9 |
|- style="background:#cfc;"
| 1989-06-17 || Win ||align=left| Kompayak Singmanee || Lumpinee Stadium || Bangkok, Thailand  || Decision || 5 || 3:00
|- style="background:#cfc;"
| 1989-05-27 || Win ||align=left| Krirkchai Por.Kiattalingchan || Lumpinee Stadium || Bangkok, Thailand  || Decision || 5 || 3:00
|- style="background:#cfc;"
| 1989-05-08 || Win ||align=left| Kongkiat Sor.Rangsanpanit || || Sisaket, Thailand  || Decision || 5 || 3:00
|- style="background:#cfc;"
| 1989-04-29 || Win ||align=left| Pornimit Muanglopburi || Lumpinee Stadium || Bangkok, Thailand  || Decision || 5 || 3:00
|- style="background:#fbb;"
| 1989-03-25 || Loss ||align=left| Deenueng Por.Pattanakit || Lumpinee Stadium || Bangkok, Thailand  || KO || 3 ||
|- style="background:#cfc;"
| 1989-02-21 || Win ||align=left| Kaowaew Kor.Pongkiat || Lumpinee Stadium || Bangkok, Thailand  || Decision || 5 || 3:00
|- style="background:#fbb;"
| 1989-01-31 || Loss ||align=left| Kaowaew Kor.Pongkiat || Lumpinee Stadium || Bangkok, Thailand  || Decision || 5 || 3:00
|- style="background:#cfc;"
| 1988-12-16 || Win ||align=left| Singtongnoi Sor.Siamchai || Lumpinee Stadium || Bangkok, Thailand  || Decision || 5 || 3:00
|- style="background:#fbb;"
| 1988-10-28 || Loss ||align=left| Dejrit Sor.Ploenjit || Lumpinee Stadium || Bangkok, Thailand  || Decision || 5 || 3:00
|- style="background:#cfc;"
| 1988-10-11 || Win ||align=left| Huahinlek Lukwaree || Lumpinee Stadium || Bangkok, Thailand  || Decision || 5 || 3:00
|- style="background:#cfc;"
| 1988-07-26 || Win ||align=left| Akaradej Sitkhosa || Lumpinee Stadium || Bangkok, Thailand  || Decision || 5 || 3:00
|- style="background:#fbb;"
| 1988-05-03 || Loss ||align=left| Oley Kiatoneway || Lumpinee Stadium || Bangkok, Thailand  || Decision || 5 || 3:00
|- style="background:#cfc;"
| 1988-02-13 || Win ||align=left| Saengdao Kiatanan || Lumpinee Stadium || Bangkok, Thailand  || Decision || 5 || 3:00
|-
| colspan=9 | Legend:

References

1973 births
2021 deaths
Namkabuan Nongkeepahuyuth
Namkabuan Nongkeepahuyuth
Featherweight kickboxers
Deaths from lung cancer
Deaths from cancer in Thailand

th:นำขบวน หนองกี่พาหุยุทธ